Haiti competed at the 2015 Pan American Games in Toronto, Ontario, Canada from July 10 to 26, 2015.

On July 3, 2015 a team of 11 athletes in 5 sports was announced by the Comité Olympique Haïtien. Weightlifter Edouard Joseph was the flagbearer for the team during the opening ceremony.

Haiti (along with nine other countries) left the games without winning a medal, tying the result from four years prior in 2011.

Competitors
The following table lists Haiti's delegation per sport and gender.

Athletics

Haiti qualified six athletes (three of each gender).

Men
Track

Field

Women
Track

Field

Swimming

Haiti received one male universality spot.

Men

Taekwondo

Haiti received a wildcard to enter one female athlete.

Weightlifting

Haiti qualified one male weightlifter. Haiti later received a wildcard to enter a female athlete.

Wrestling

Haiti received one wildcard.

Men's Greco-Roman

See also
Haiti at the 2016 Summer Olympics

References

Nations at the 2015 Pan American Games
P
2015